Adam Hawkins (born July 1976) is an American recording and mix engineer.

Life and career 
Hawkins was born in New Jersey, and later moved with his family to North Carolina. After graduating from high school he moved back to New Jersey to become a studio assistant in Manhattan.

The album Hello Hurricane, which Hawkins worked on, received the 2010 Grammy award for best rock or rap gospel album.

Discography

References

External links 
 

1976 births
Living people
Musicians from New Jersey
Grammy Award winners
Audio production engineers